Juan Ignacio Carrera (born 10 May 1981 in Pergamino, Buenos Aires) is an Argentine football goalkeeper currently playing for San Martín de Tucumán.

External links
  Statistics at Futbol XXI
 Football-Lineups player profile

1981 births
Living people
People from Pergamino
Argentine footballers
Sarmiento de Resistencia footballers
Association football goalkeepers
Argentinos Juniors footballers
Argentine Primera División players
Sportspeople from Buenos Aires Province